Place Publique is a centre-left political party in France, founded in 2018 by Raphaël Glucksmann, Claire Nouvian, Jo Spiegel, and Thomas Porcher.

In January 2019, the movement claimed 25,000 members.

History

Creation 
The party was officially founded on 10 August 2018. On October 29, 2018, Raphaël Glucksmann, Thomas Porcher, Jo Spiegel, Diana Filippova, and Claire Nouvian announced the creation of Place Publique, a political party aiming to bring together the pro-European French left from Europe Ecology – The Greens to the Socialist Party and Génération.s. Their position was presented as an alternative to La France Insoumise, although Thomas Porcher declared that the movement was not against Jean-Luc Mélenchon.

On 6 November 2018, Raphaël Glucksmann and several party leaders published a manifesto announcing the birth of their movement.

2019 European Elections 
On 16 March 2019, Place Publique and the Socialist Party announced that they would present a joint list at the European Parliament election, with Raphaël Glucksmann as the head of the list. Thomas Porcher left the party the same day, denouncing a "list of apparatchiks". Place Publique won 2 seats in the election.

Election results

European Parliament

References

External links
official site

 
2018 establishments in France
Political parties established in 2018
Social democratic parties in France
Social liberal parties